Agnes Irwin (December 30, 1841 – December 5, 1914) was an American educator, best known as the first dean of Radcliffe College (1894-1909). Prior to that, she served as the principal of the West Penn Square Seminary for Young Ladies in Philadelphia (later renamed as the Agnes Irwin School).

Formative years
Born in Washington, D.C. on December 30, 1841, Agnes Irwin was a daughter of United States Congressman William Wallace Irwin (1803-1856) and Sophia Arabella (Bache) Irwin (1815-1904), a native of Philadelphia, Pennsylvania who was a daughter of Richard Bache, Jr. of the Republic of Texas Navy and Second Texas Legislature (1847), and Sophia Burrell Dallas, daughter of Arabella Maria Smith and Alexander J. Dallas, an American statesman who served as the U.S. Treasury Secretary under President James Madison.

Agnes Irwin was also a great-granddaughter of Sarah Franklin Bache and Richard Bache, and the great-great-granddaughter of Benjamin Franklin, as well as a grandniece of George Mifflin Dallas, the 11th Vice President of the United States, serving under James K. Polk.

Academic career
In 1869, Agnes Irwin took over the administration of West Penn Square Seminary for Young Ladies (1869-1894) in Philadelphia and transformed it into an institution of disciplined teaching. The school would be renamed in her honor. Believing in the importance of higher education for women, she was among the first to prepare students for the examinations given by Harvard College, to credential women for teaching, and by Bryn Mawr College, to qualify for entrance.  The success of The Agnes Irwin School won Irwin the support of Harvard’s president, Charles William Eliot, and led to her selection as first dean of Radcliffe College in 1894, a position she held until 1909.

While Dean of Radcliffe College, Irwin personally paid for two exam proctors to assist with Helen Keller's education—one to monitor Helen and the other to watch Helen's proctor.

From 1911-1914, Irwin served as the first president of the Headmistresses’ Association of Private Schools.

Irwin was the recipient of 3 Honorary Degrees:

- 1895 - Degree Unknown - Western University of Pennsylvania (Now University of Pittsburgh)

- 1898 - LittD. - University of Pennsylvania

- 1906 - Hood 8 Degree bestowed by Andrew Carnegie - University of St. Andrews

Illness, death and interment
Irwin fell ill with pneumonia in Philadelphia in 1914, and died there on December 5, 1914. She was interred at Philadelphia's Saint James the Less Episcopal Churchyard.

Legacy
Today, The Agnes Irwin School continues to be a leader in girls' education with approximately 600 girls enrolled in pre-kindergarten to 12th grades. The school is currently located in suburban Rosemont, Pennsylvania, 10 miles west of Philadelphia.
Irwin died of pneumonia in Philadelphia in 1914.

Irwin was the subject of a 1934 biography by Agnes Repplier.

References

External links

 

1841 births
1914 deaths
Educators from Philadelphia
American women educators
Radcliffe College faculty
Franklin family
People from Washington, D.C.
Deaths from pneumonia in Pennsylvania